Zachernaya is a rural locality (a village) in Chernovskoye Rural Settlement, Bolshesosnovsky District, Perm Krai, Russia. The population was 76 as of 2010. There is 1 street.

Geography 
Zachernaya is located 23 km south of Bolshaya Sosnova (the district's administrative centre) by road. Chernovskoye is the nearest rural locality.

References 

Rural localities in Bolshesosnovsky District